Francisco Martin Borque (1917-1998) was a Mexican businessman.

He was born in Soria, Spain on August 9, 1917, and died on December 24, 1998, in Torreon, Coahuila, their family arrived Veracruz port on October 30, 1926, then moved to Torreon with their uncle Pascual Borque, in 1930's decade toured Chihuahua, Sinaloa and Sonora sierras. He married Ana María Bringas on February 15, 1949, and in 1968 opened their first hypermarket under the name of Soriana.

References

20th-century Spanish businesspeople
Spanish emigrants to Mexico
Soriana
1917 births
1998 deaths
20th-century Mexican businesspeople